This is the list of disincorporated cities and towns in Georgia.

1916 
 Mableton

1965
 North Atlanta

1978 
 Mountain View (also known as Rough and Ready)

1995 

On July 1, 1995, the Georgia General Assembly disincorporated multiple cities, because they did not have an active government and offer at least three municipal services. 

 Chattahoochee Plantation
 Elizabeth
 Grooverville
 Mountville
 Omaha
 The Rock
 Russell

1999 

 Mineral Bluff

2000 

 Bibb City
 Corinth

2001 

 Lithia Springs

Others 

 Naylor (1990s)
 Center (ca. 2004)

References